Weald of Kent Grammar School is a selective or grammar school with academy status in Tonbridge, Kent, England, for girls aged 11–18 and boys aged 16–18. Selection is by the Kent test.

The school holds specialisms in languages and science.

On 15 October 2015, the government gave permission for the school to create an "annexe" in Sevenoaks. Before this time no new grammar schools were permitted so Sevenoakes which was non selective, was not permitted to create one. This judgement was controversial.

Buildings
Weald of Kent is a fairly modern school with many additional extensions. In 2003, a canteen operated by independent catering contractors was built called 'La Wokerie' - a pun derived from the school's name "WOK". In 2006, a new English and Humanities Block was built, referred to by most students as 'the new building' It offered larger classrooms, some of which have false walls between two of them which can open up to create one large room. A new Arts and Drama suite was completed in early 2008. In the beginning of 2014, another two storey building was built for Maths and Examinations, and an extension to 'La Wokerie' was added by converting the adjacent classroom into a diner style restaurant with extra seating and a salad bar. Following the conversion of the old gymnasium into the 'Sixth Form Hub', accompanying the 'Sixth Form Café', the school opened a new sports hall towards the end of 2016. The opening was attended by British gymnast Max Whitlock.

Sevenoaks annexe
On 15 October 2015, Nicky Morgan, the Education Secretary, announced that government would give permission for the school to create an "annexe" in Sevenoaks, which had no grammar schools. The site for the 'annexe' is that of the former Wildernesse School on Seal Hollow Road, preparations started on the site soon after planning permission was granted in 2014.

The decision is controversial; as 1998 legislation barred any new school from adopting selective admissions. This action was seen as a way round this legislation. It was supported by Kent County Council and an active group of parents, but opposed by others.

An earlier attempt had been rejected by the then Education Secretary Michael Gove in December 2013, as a single-sex school could not legally open a co-educational annexe. Parents had been balloted on whether the school should change its status and they had chosen to remain a girls only school. Kent County Council revised the scheme so the units became modular, and the application was resubmitted. It is this application that was approved. The annexe opened in September 2017.

Results
Exam results for the 2013 academic year showed that 100% of pupils attained 5 GCSE grades A* to C (including English and maths). 99.1% of the A level grades were A* to E. The school was judged by OFSTED to be academically 'outstanding' prior to its conversion to an academy. OFSTED state that you are not the same entity and have no previous inspection grade once converted. It was first inspected in 2022 and found to be 'Requires Improvement'. It has National Teaching School status since 2014.

Alumni
 Nina Ridge, weather forecaster on BBC One
 Abbie Hutty, mechanical engineer

See also
Knole Academy
Tonbridge Grammar School
Tunbridge Wells Girls' Grammar School
Tunbridge Wells Grammar School for Boys

Notes and references
Footnotes

References

External links
School website
Sevenoaks Grammar school campaign
University Website

Grammar schools in Kent
Girls' schools in Kent
Schools in Tonbridge
Academies in Kent